Patrick Daniel Welch (December 12, 1948 – January 7, 2020) was an American politician who served as a Democratic member of the Illinois Senate, representing the 38th district from 1983 to 2005. He served as an Assistant Majority Leader during his final term.

Early life
Patrick Welch was born on December 12, 1948, in Chicago, Illinois. He attended college earning a Bachelor of Arts in Government from Southern Illinois University and a J.D. degree from the Illinois Institute of Technology’s Chicago-Kent College of Law.

Illinois Senate
Welch first entered the Illinois Senate after winning what was thought to be a strongly Republican district against Betty J. Hoxsey in the closest Illinois Senate election of 1982. During his time in the Illinois Senate he was appointed to the Illinois Task Force on Global Climate Change, and proposed saving taxpayers money by eliminating the office of Lieutenant Governor of Illinois During his tenure Welch was a perennial target of the Illinois Republican Party, but managed to defeat major efforts to unseat him including a $500,000 spending effort in 1990 and a 700 vote margin of victory in 1994. He lost election in 2004 to Gary G. Dahl.

Death
He died of complications of a stroke on January 7, 2020, at age 71. He was also suffering from dementia prior to his death.

References

External links
Illinois General Assembly - Senator Patrick Welch (D) 38th District official IL Senate website
Bills Committees
Follow the Money - Patrick Welch
2004 2000 1998 1996 campaign contributions
LaSalle County Democrats - Patrick Welch profile

1948 births
2020 deaths
People with dementia
People from Peru, Illinois
Lawyers from Chicago
Politicians from Chicago
Southern Illinois University alumni
Chicago-Kent College of Law alumni
Democratic Party Illinois state senators